Silicide carbides or carbide silicides are compounds containing anions composed of silicide (Si4−) and carbide (C4−) or clusters therof. They can be considered as mixed anion compounds or intermetallic compounds, as silicon could be considered as a semimetal. 

Related compounds include the germanide carbides, phosphide silicides, boride carbides and nitride carbides. Other related compounds may contain more condensed anion combinations such as the carbidonitridosilicates with C(SiN3)4 with N bridging between two silicon atoms.

Production 
Silicide carbide compounds can be made by heating silicon, graphite, and metal together. It is important to exclude oxygen before and during the reaction. The flux method involves a reaction in a molten metal. Gallium is suitable, because it dissolves carbon and silicon, but does not react with them.

Properties 
Silicide carbides are a kind of ceramic, yet they also have metallic properties. They are not as brittle as most ceramics, but are stiffer than metals. They have high melting temperatures.

In air silicide carbide compounds are stable, and are hardly affected by water. The appearance is often metallic grey. When powdered the colour is dark grey.

When ErFe2SiC is dissolved in acid, mostly methane is produced, but the products include some hydrocarbons with two and three carbon atoms.

The lanthanide contraction is evident with the cell sizes for rare earth element silicide carbides.

List

References

Carbides
Mixed anion compounds
Silicides